Destrehan High School is a public high school located in Destrehan, Louisiana, United States and is approximately twenty-five miles west of New Orleans. It is part of the St. Charles Parish Public School System and serves all students on the east bank of the Mississippi River from grades 9 through 12.

It serves the communities of Destrehan, Montz, New Sarpy, Norco, and St. Rose.

History
In 1923, the Mexican Petroleum Company donated three and one half acres of property to the St. Charles Parish School Board for the construction of a high school. On August 7, 1923, the school board president accepted the donation and St. Charles Parish approved a bond issue for school construction. Destrehan High School was dedicated on September 15, 1924 and the facility received 234 pupils in grades one through eleven. The location of the original high school was on River Road, approximately 0.3 miles downriver from the St. Charles Borromeo Church on the current site of Harry Hurst Middle School. Destrehan's first graduating class consisted of Placide Hotard and Eldridge Gervais.

Destrehan football began eleven-man team play in 1946. In 1948, ground was broken on Destrehan High Stadium as the home for the football team. The 1,200-seat stadium, completed in 1949, was located behind the original high school main building and cost $18,000 to build. The Pan-American Petroleum Company donated the land to build the stadium.

A new gymnasium was constructed on the Destrehan campus in 1954.

In 1969, then all-black Mary M. Bethune High School in Norco was closed. Elementary-aged children attended schools directed by court guidelines, and high school students moved to Destrehan High School.

The process of integrating the two student bodies caused several disruptions. On October 7, 1974, students were sent home early after racially motivated fights broke out in the school. Another incident between a bus full of black students and white parents and students resulted in 13-year-old Timothy Weber, who was standing outside with his mother, being shot. Gary Tyler, a black student, was arrested and later convicted of the murder. A federal appeals court ruled Tyler did not receive a fair trial, but he was never retried and remained in prison until his release in May 2016.

The original high school located on River Road closed after the completion of the 1974 school year. The new campus located at its current location on Wildcat Lane opened on November 16, 1975. In 1977, the original high school main building was damaged by fire and was later demolished.

In 1981, the Destrehan High School Athletic Field and Field House were completed on the new school campus. The athletic field was later renamed Wildcat Stadium.

Beginning in 2005, students in grades 11 and 12 from both Destrehan and Hahnville High School's have had the option to attend the school district's Satellite Center for half of the school day. The goal is for students to concentrate on career paths that are projected to expand the most over the next decade. Courses at the Satellite Center include: Advanced Television Broadcasting, Digital Media, Engineering Design, Interactive Media, Process Technology (PTEC), Health Care Exploration, Patient Care, Hotel-Restaurant and Tourism (HRT) Administration, Culinary Arts, and Students Teaching And Reaching (STAR). As of the 2018–2019 school year, the Satellite Center added courses in Instrumentation and Health Clinical. Thus, the courses of Digital Media, Interactive Media, and Advanced Television Broadcasting were moved into the academic wing of the school district's brand new Rodney Lafon Performing Arts Center less than a block away from the Satellite Center. Despite the move, these three courses are still considered a part of the Satellite Center.

In 2017, Destrehan High School was one of thirty high schools world-wide to be named "world-leading learners" and to receive a fellowship based on academic excellence, and reducing the achievement gap between racial and socioeconomic groups and innovation.

On August 29, 2021, the school suffered significant damage caused by Hurricane Ida. The roof of the main building, which houses the administrative offices, the library and auditorium, collapsed. Additional campus buildings including the gymnasium also received damage from the hurricane. The students attended Hahnville High School for an alternating-day schedule while repairs were being made. The school reopened on January 18, 2022.

In 2022, expansion and renovation of Wildcat Gymnasium was completed. The expansion increased seating capacity to 1,000 and a new auxiliary gym and elevated running track were built.

Classroom expansion
To accommodate for larger student bodies, the school has had numerous building additions and wing expansions.

The Mathematics Building (known today as "Building D") was completed in 1993. It is a one-story, t-shaped building with a total of 14 classrooms. It also added a new textbook storage room when it was built. Originally intended as a mathematics building, it now houses most sophomore core classes and some senior core classes. One of the classrooms has been converted to a staff lounge. The building is located (if facing from the main entrance) right of the softball field, left of the main building, in front of the JROTC building, and behind the Gym Building ("Building C").

The JROTC Building (known today as "Building G") was completed in 1996. It was originally a two classroom building with two one-person restrooms. In 2014, the building was expanded adding two more one-person restrooms, a new office and a new drumline room. After removing the portable classrooms that Building L replaced, students in ROTC have access to a large yard space for practice. If facing the front, the building is located directly left of the shop buildings, right of the back field behind the "D" building and in front of the tennis court.

The Humanities Building (known today as "Building B") was completed in 2001. The building added roughly 25 new classrooms.

The newest building (known as "Building L") was completed in 2014. It added 17 new regular-sized classrooms and six specialty rooms.

Athletics
The Destrehan High School athletic teams, known as the Fighting Wildcats and Lady Cats, compete in the Louisiana High School Athletic Association (LHSAA).

Baseball
Basketball (Co-ed)
Cross Country (Co-ed)
Football
Golf (Co-ed)
Soccer (Co-ed)
Softball
Swimming (Co-ed)
Tennis (Co-ed)
Track and Field (Co-ed)
Volleyball
Wrestling

Athletic facilities

Football
The Destrehan Fighting Wildcats football team competes in District 7-5A in the LHSAA. The Fighting Wildcats play their home games at 5,000-seat Wildcat Stadium. They are coached by Marcus Scott.

State championships
(5) Football championships: 1941, 1949, 1973, 2007, 2008, 2022

Championship history
The 2007 state championship team finished the season ranked 22nd in the nation and the 2008 state championship team finished the season ranked 18th in the nation. Those teams under head coach Stephen Robicheaux were part of a 30-game winning streak from 2007 to September 2009.

The Fighting Wildcats have won twenty-five LHSAA district championships: 1949, 1958, 1963, 1972, 1973, 1974, 1981, 1991, 1996, 1997, 1998, 1999, 2001, 2002, 2007, 2008, 2013, 2014, 2015, 2016, 2018, 2019, 2020, 2021, 2022

The Fighting Wildcats have made the LHSAA playoffs forty-four times: 1941, 1949, 1958, 1963, 1969, 1971, 1972, 1973, 1974, 1976, 1981, 1983, 1984, 1985, 1988, 1989, 1990, 1991, 1992, 1993, 1996, 1997, 1998, 1999, 2000, 2001, 2002, 2003, 2004, 2005, 2006, 2007, 2008, 2009, 2013, 2014, 2015, 2016, 2017, 2018, 2019, 2020, 2021, 2022

Baseball
The Destrehan Fighting Wildcats baseball team competes in District 7-5A in the LHSAA. The Fighting Wildcats play their home games at Fighting Wildcats Baseball Field. They are coached by Christopher Mire.

State championships
(2) Baseball championship: 1955, 1964

Boys' basketball
The Destrehan Fighting Wildcats basketball team competes in District 7-5A in the LHSAA. The Fighting Wildcats play their home games at Wildcat Gymnasium. They are coached by Khary Carrell.

Girls' basketball
The Destrehan Lady Cats basketball team competes in District 7-5A in the LHSAA. The Lady Cats play their home games at Wildcat Gymnasium. They are coached by Twalla Powell.

State championships
Girls' basketball championship: 2017

Track and field
The Destrehan Fighting Wildcats and Lady Cats track and field teams compete in District 7-5A in the LHSAA. Home track meets are held at Wildcat Stadium.

State Championships
Boys' track and field championship: 1971

Band
The Pride of Destrehan Fighting Wildcat Band is the name of the band representing the school.

Notable alumni

Arts and entertainment
Shelley Hennig, actress and Miss Teen USA
Mike A. Young, actor

Athletics
Paul F. Boudreau, NFL and CFL assistant coach
Burnell Dent, NFL linebacker
Jordan Jefferson, NFL quarterback
Justin Jefferson, NFL wide receiver
Damaris Johnson, NFL wide receiver/punt returner
Jamall Johnson, NFL linebacker and actor
Glen Logan, NFL defensive tackle
Damon Mason, AFL defensive back and AFL assistant coach
Rondell Mealey, NFL running back
Kirk Merritt, NFL wide receiver
Jerico Nelson, NFL safety
Jeremy Parquet, NFL offensive lineman
Rusty Rebowe, NFL linebacker
Tim Rebowe, head football coach at Nicholls State University
Ed Reed, NFL safety and NFL assistant coach; Member of the NFL Hall of Fame and College Football Hall of Fame 
Darryl Richard, NFL defensive tackle
Mike Scifres, NFL punter
Darrington Sentimore, NFL defensive end
Josh Victorian, NFL cornerback
Darius Vinnett, NFL cornerback
Devon Walker, safety for Tulane University and New Orleans Saints
Michael Young Jr., NFL wide receiver

Elected officials and judiciary
Joel T. Chaisson, II, Louisiana State Senate president and district attorney
Gary Smith Jr., Louisiana state senator

See also
List of high schools in Louisiana

References

External links

Destrehan High School website

Public high schools in Louisiana
Schools in St. Charles Parish, Louisiana
Educational institutions established in 1924
1924 establishments in Louisiana